HMS Tourmaline (J339) was a  of the Royal Navy during the Second World War. Originally planned as USS Usage (AM-130), of the United States Navy's , she was transferred to the United Kingdom under Lend-Lease.

Career 
Usage was laid down on 1 January 1942 at Chickasaw, Alabama, by the Gulf Shipbuilding Corp.; launched on 4 October 1942; and transferred to the United Kingdom under lend-lease on 7 June 1943.

Usage served with the Royal Navy as HMS Tourmaline (J339) in the Atlantic Ocean in World War II. She was returned to United States custody in January 1947, struck from the Navy list, and transferred to the Foreign Liquidation Commission for disposition. Sold to Turkey, she served with the Turkish Navy under the name Çardak until 1974.

References

External links
 
 U-boat.net - USS Usage (AM 130)

 

Auk-class minesweepers of the United States Navy
Ships built in Chickasaw, Alabama
1942 ships
Catherine-class minesweepers
World War II minesweepers of the United States
World War II minesweepers of the United Kingdom